Rich Lake is an unincorporated community in northern Alberta, Canada within Lac La Biche County.

Notable people 

 Amy Malbeuf – Métis visual artist, educator, and cultural tattoo practitioner

References

Localities in Lac La Biche County